David Thomas Delpy,  (born 11 August 1948), is a British bioengineer, and Hamamatsu Professor of Medical Photonics, at University College London.

Education
Delpy was educated at Heaton Grammar School in Newcastle. He went on to study at Brunel University, graduating with a first class Bachelor of Science degree in Applied Physics. He was awarded a Doctor of Science degree by University College London in Medical physics.

Career and research
Delpy served as Chief Executive of the Engineering and Physical Sciences Research Council.

As of 2014, he is chairman of the Defence Scientific Advisory Council and a member of the strategic advisory board of the EPSRC's quantum technologies programme.

Awards and honours
Delpy was appointed CBE in the 2014 Birthday Honours for services to engineering and scientific research. He was elected a Fellow of the Royal Society (FRS) in 1999. He was also elected a Fellow of the Royal Academy of Engineering in 2002.

In 2008 he was awarded the Institute of Physics Rosalind Franklin Medal and Prize.

References

External links
"Exclusive Interview: EPSRC's new chief executive, David Delpy", Chemistry World, 11 October 2007
"EPSRC: mutual benefits undermined by war of all against all for funding", Paul Jump, Times Higher Education, 3 March 2011
http://www.octnews.org/topic/profile/david-t-delpy/
https://web.archive.org/web/20120523083232/http://www.ukcds.org.uk/person-Professor_David_Delpy-15.html
http://www.iop.org/news/11/sept/file_52217.pdf

Fellows of the Royal Society
Academics of University College London
Commanders of the Order of the British Empire
Living people
British bioengineers
1948 births
Place of birth missing (living people)
Engineers from Tyne and Wear